The Old Kings Arms is a public house at 7 George Street, St Albans, Hertfordshire, England. The timber framed building is sixteenth century and is listed Grade II with Historic England.

It was closed for over a decade, before reopening under the name "Dylans" in 2015.

References

External links

Pubs in St Albans
Grade II listed pubs in Hertfordshire
Timber framed pubs in Hertfordshire
Buildings and structures in St Albans